
This is a list of aircraft in alphabetical order beginning with 'S'.

SS

SSH
(SSH - Serwis Samolotow Historycznych-Janusz Karasiewicz - Janusz historic Aircraft Services)
 SSH T-131 Jungmann
 SSH Bü 133 Jungmeister

S S Pierce 
(S S (Samuel) Pierce Aeroplane Co, Southampton, NY)
 S S Pierce Sporting Tractor

References

Further reading

External links

 List Of Aircraft (S)

de:Liste von Flugzeugtypen/N–S
fr:Liste des aéronefs (N-S)
nl:Lijst van vliegtuigtypes (N-S)
pt:Anexo:Lista de aviões (N-S)
ru:Список самолётов (N-S)
sv:Lista över flygplan/N-S
vi:Danh sách máy bay (N-S)